Guildford is a town centre and neighbourhood of Surrey, British Columbia, Canada. It is known for its retail corridors along 104 Avenue and 152 Street. At the intersection of these two streets sits the 200-store Guildford Town Centre (also known as the Guildford Shopping Centre). The community is named after Guildford in Surrey, England.

Although Guildford is geographically large, the Guildford "area" is locally considered to centre around the Guildford Town Centre mall and its surrounding blocks. It is also home to the Guildford Recreation Centre, which is owned and operated by the City of Surrey to serve the recreational needs of local residents.

As of the 2016 census, the population of Guildford is 60,745.

Geography

Guildford occupies the northeastern corner of the city of Surrey with its northern border the shores of the Fraser River, its western border extending to roughly 144th Street and the east adjoining the city of Langley at 196th Street. Its southern border with the neighbourhood of Fleetwood extends roughly to 96th Avenue while its southern border with the neighbourhood of Cloverdale extends to roughly 84th and 80th Avenue.

Demographics

See also 
 Guildford Exchange
 Surrey-Whalley provincial electoral district
 List of largest enclosed shopping malls in Canada

References

External links 
 City of Surrey website

Neighbourhoods in Surrey, British Columbia